Warlocks and Warriors is an anthology of fantasy short stories  edited by Canadian author and editor Douglas Hill. It was first published in paperback by Mayflower in 1971.

Summary
The book collects six tales by various authors, with an overall introduction by Hill.

Contents
"Introduction" (Douglas Hill)
"The Sleeping Sorceress" (Michael Moorcock)
"The Curse of the Monolith" (Lin Carter and L. Sprague de Camp)
"The Ogyr of the Snows" (Martin Hillman)
"The Wager Lost by Winning" (John Brunner)
"The Wreck of the Kissing Bitch" (Keith Roberts)
"The Unholy Grail" (Fritz Leiber)

Notes

1971 anthologies
Fantasy anthologies